But a Short Time to Live is a 1951 crime thriller novel by the British writer James Hadley Chase. It was originally published under the pen name of Raymond Marshall. In the United States it was known by the alternative title The Pick-up.

In 1968 it was adapted into a French film A Little Virtuous  directed by Serge Korber and starring Dany Carrel, Jacques Perrin and Robert Hossein.

References

Bibliography
 Goble, Alan. The Complete Index to Literary Sources in Film. Walter de Gruyter, 1999.
 Server, Lee. Encyclopedia of Pulp Fiction Writers. Infobase Publishing, 2014.

1951 British novels
Novels by James Hadley Chase
British thriller novels
British novels adapted into films
Novels set in London
Jarrold Publishing books